The Lent Bumps 2017 was a series of rowing races at Cambridge University from Tuesday 28 February 2017 to Saturday 4 March 2017. The event was run as a bumps race and was the 130th set of races in the series of Lent Bumps which have been held annually in late February or early March since 1887. See Lent Bumps for the format of the races.

Head of the River crews

Downing had bumped Caius on day 1, and rowed over as head on day 2.  won blades, rising to 10th.

  women retained their headship won in 2016.  won blades, rising to second place.

Links to races in other years

References
 Bumps results: Lent Bumps 2017 Men's Division - CamFM
 Bumps Results: Lent Bumps 2017 Women's Division - CamFM

2017 in rowing
Lent Bumps results
2017 in English sport